The Massachusetts Museum of Contemporary Art (MASS MoCA) is a museum in a converted Arnold Print Works factory building complex located in North Adams, Massachusetts. It is one of the largest centers for contemporary visual art and performing arts in the United States.  

Built by the Arnold Print Works, which operated on the site from 1860 to 1942, the complex was used by the Sprague Electric company before its conversion. It has expanded since, including the 2008 expansion of Building 7 and the May 2017 addition of roughly 130,000 square feet when Building 6 was opened.

In addition to housing galleries and performing arts spaces, it also rents space to commercial tenants. It is the home of the Bang on a Can Summer Institute, where composers and performers from around the world come to create new music. The festival, started in 2001, includes concerts in galleries for three weeks during the summer. Starting in 2010, MASS MoCA has become the home for the Solid Sound Music Festival.

MASS MoCA, along with the Clark Art Institute and the Williams College Museum of Art (WCMA), forms a trio of significant art museums in the northern Berkshires.

Museum location and history

Arnold Print Works
The buildings that MASS MoCA now occupies were originally built between 1870 and 1900 by the company Arnold Print Works. These buildings, however, were not the first to occupy this site. Since colonial times small-scale industries had been located on this strategic peninsular location between the north and south branches of the Hoosic River. In 1860 the Arnold brothers arrived at this site and set up their company with the latest equipment for printing cloth. They began operating in 1862 and quickly took off. Aiding their success were large government contracts during the Civil War to supply cloth for the Union Army.

In December 1871, a fire swept through the Arnold Print Works factory and destroyed eight of its buildings. Rebuilding started almost immediately and an expanded complex was finished in 1874. Despite a nationwide depression during the 1870s Arnold Print Works purchased additional land along the Hoosic River and constructed new buildings. By 1900, every building but one in today's Marshall Street complex was constructed.

At its peak in 1905, Arnold print works employed more than 3,000 workers and was one of the world's leading producers of printed textiles. Arnold produced 580,000 yards or 330 miles of cloth per week. Arnold had offices in New York City and Paris. In addition to printing the textiles, Arnold Print Works expanded and built their own cloth-weaving facilities in order to produce "grey cloth", which was the crude, unfinished textile from which printed color cloth was made.

In 1942 Arnold Print Works was forced to close its doors and leave North Adams due to the low prices of cloth produced in the South and abroad, as well as the economic effects of the Great Depression.

Sprague Electric Company
Robert C. Sprague's (son of Frank J. Sprague) Sprague Electric Company was a local North Adams company, and it purchased the Marshall Street complex to produce capacitors. During World War II Sprague operated around the clock and employed a large female workforce—not only due to the lack of men, but also because it took small hands and manual dexterity to construct the small, hand-rolled capacitors. In addition to manufacturing electrical components, Sprague had a large research and development department. This department was responsible for research, design, and manufacturing of the trigger for the atomic bomb and components used in the launch systems for the Gemini space missions.

At its peak during the 1960s Sprague employed 4,137 workers in a community of 18,000. Essentially the factory was a small city within a city with employees working alongside friends, neighbors and relatives. The company was almost completely self-sufficient, holding a radio station, orchestra, vocational school, research library, day-care center, clinic, cooperative grocery store, sports teams, and a gun club with a shooting range on the campus.

In the 1980s Sprague began to face difficulties with global changes in the electronics industry. Cheaper electronic components were being produced in Asia combined with changes in high-tech electronics forced Sprague to sell and shutdown its factory in 1985. As a result, North Adams was left "deindustrialized" and found itself on a steep economic decline.

The site was formerly listed as a superfund contaminated site.  The complex was listed on the National Register of Historic Places in 1985.

MASS MoCA
The development of MASS MoCA began a year after Sprague vacated the buildings. In 1986 a group of staff from the nearby Williams College Museum of Art were looking for large factory or mill buildings where they could display and exhibit large works of modern and contemporary art that they weren't able to display in their more traditional museum/gallery setting. They were directed to the Marshall Street complex by the mayor of North Adams. When they spent time with the space, they quickly realized the buildings had much more potential than an offshoot gallery. The process for MASS MoCA began.

It took a number of years of fund-raising and organization to develop MASS MoCA. During this process the project evolved to create not only new museum/gallery space but also a performing arts venue.  The transformation was chronicled by photographer Nicholas Whitman's Mass MoCA: From Mill to Museum.
The museum was granted $18.6 million by the Commonwealth of Massachusetts after a public/private coalition petitioned the state government to support the project. Local residents and businesses contributed $8 million to the project.  In 1999 MASS MoCA opened its doors.

Designed by the Cambridge architecture firm of Bruner Cott & Assoc, it was awarded highest honors by the American Institute of Architects and The National Trust for Historic Preservation.

In 2015, an Assets for Artists residency program began providing artists and writers business coaching and studio space at the museum and at Maker’s Mill, a collaborative workspace founded that year to bring to downtown North Adams the “artisanal work that once formed the manufacturing economy of the region, fiber arts and printing.”

On May 29, 2017, Building 6 was opened as gallery space, adding some 130,000 square feet of exhibition space.

The museum is the subject of the 2018 documentary film Museum Town.

Ongoing exhibitions

Sol LeWitt Wall Drawing Retrospective Exhibition
On November 16, 2008, the museum opened an exhibition of Sol LeWitt wall drawings in partnership with Yale University Art Gallery and Williams College Museum of Art. The exhibition, Sol LeWitt: A Wall Drawing Retrospective occupies a  building located at the center of the campus. More than 100 monumental wall drawings and paints conceived by the artist from 1968 to 2007 will be on view through 2033. Cambridge-based Bruner/Cott & Associates converted the historic mill building and worked with LeWitt to design the gallery space. LeWitt designed the final placement of the drawings before his death in April 2007, and the drawings were installed by a team of draftsmen between April 1 and September 30, 2008.  The exhibition was chosen as the "top museum exhibition of 2008" by Time Magazine.

Anselm Kiefer 
A collaboration with the Hall Art Foundation, this presentation of work by German painter and sculptor Anselm Kiefer consists of three monumentally scaled installations, Etroits Sont Les Vaisseaux, Les Femmes De La Revolution, and Velimir Chlebnikov, and occupies a 10,000 square foot building renovated for the exhibition. On view Spring/Summer/Fall through 2028.

Natalie Jeremijenko
Tree Logic. Installed in the museum's front courtyard, this project displays the slow yet dynamic changes of six live trees, inverted and suspended from a truss, over time.

James Turrell
Into the Light. A multi-decade retrospective of Turrell’s work in B6: The Robert W. Wilson Building. This exhibition features a major work from each decade of the artist’s career.

Past exhibitions

Invisible Cities 
Titled after an Italo Calvino book, the exhibition featured the work of ten artists who reimagine urban landscapes both familiar and fantastical. Invisible Cities included works by Lee Bul, Carlos Garaicoa, and Sopheap Pich, as well as commissions by Diana Al Hadid, Francesco Simeti, Miha Strukelj, and local artists Kim Faler and Mary Lum.

Oh, Canada 
The largest survey of contemporary Canadian art ever produced outside Canada, "Oh, Canada" features work by more than 60 artists from every Canadian province and nearly every Canadian territory, spanning multiple generations and working in many media.

Notable participating artists:

 Kim Adams
 Shuvinai Ashoona
 Dan Barrow
 Rebecca Belmore
 Shary Boyle
 Bill Burns
 Eric Cameron
 Douglas Coupland
 Michel de Broin
 Marcel Dzama
 Michael Fernandes
 Noam Gonick and Luis Jacob
 David Hoffos
 Sarah Anne Johnson
 Garry Neill Kennedy
 Wanda Koop
 Micah Lexier
 Craig Leonard
 Kelly Mark
 Rita McKeough
 Chris Millar
 Kent Monkman
 Kim Morgan
 Annie Pootoogook
 Ned Pratt
 Michael Snow
 Charles Stankievech
 Hans Wendt
 Janet Werner

Katharina Grosse
One Floor Up More Highly. Katharina Grosse applied paint to four mounds of soil which seemed to spill from the upper balcony into the enormous space below. Stacks of styrofoam shards rose out of the mountains of color, mirroring the white of the gallery walls.

Petah Coyne
Everything That Rises Must Converge. Baroque style pieces were displayed in four galleries on MASS MoCA's main floor. One piece, "Scalapino/Nu Shu", came upon the viewer as a former apple-bearing tree. Coyne had it uprooted and brought to the museum after it stopped bearing fruit. Petah's exhibit also includes a selection of her photography.

Sean Foley
Ruse. Sean Foley's commissioned work for MASS MoCA occupied the over-100-foot-long wall outside of the Hunter Center for the Performing Arts.

Jörg Immendorff
Student of Beuys, 6 paintings. Jörg Immendorff was one of several prominent artists of the past four decades who studied under Joseph Beuys at the Düsseldorf Academy of Art. This exhibition was the second in an occasional series of shows focused on Beuys and those influenced by his work and teaching.

Jenny Holzer Projections 
On November 18, 2007, Jenny Holzer presented her first indoor projection in the United States. Holzer's projection at Mass MoCA filled a large chamber first with selected poems by Nobel laureate Wisława Szymborska, and later with selections from prose by Nobel laureate Elfriede Jelinek.

Badlands: New Horizons in Landscape 
"Badlands" (May 24, 2008 – April 12, 2009) was an exhibition of environmental art that explored contemporary artists’ fascination with the Earth and their responses to environmental concerns. Works were commissioned for the exhibit from Vaughn Bell, the Center for Land Use Interpretation, Nina Katchadourian, Joseph Smolinski and Mary Temple. Other artists exhibiting included Robert Adams,  the Boyle Family, Melissa Brown,  Leila Daw, Gregory Euclide, J. Henry Fair, Mike Glier, Anthony Goicolea, Marine Hugonnier, Paul Jacobsen, Mitchell Joachim,  Jane Marsching, Alexis Rockman, Edward Ruscha, Yutaka Sone and Jennifer Steinkamp.

Simon Starling 
Simon Starling's The Nanjing Particles opened in December 2008. Based on small stereoscopic photograph depicting a large group of Chinese workers in front of Sampson Shoe Factory. Sampson had brought them east from California to break a strike. As a result, North Adams had the largest population of Chinese workers this side of the Mississippi. He viewed the stereograph image underneath a one-million-volt electron microscope, allowing him to see individual metal particles that comprise the photograph and allowing that to propel him towards the creation of two large-scale sculptures that were manufactured by hand in Nanjing, China.

Iñigo Manglano-Ovalle 
Opening in December 2009, Iñigo Manglano-Ovalle's Gravity is a Force to be Reckoned With opened with an upside-down Mies van der Rohe glass house in MASS MoCA's large Building 5 gallery space. The architecture of the house comes from plans made by Mies van der Rohe for his house with four columns or the 50x50 house (1951), that was never realized. Within the house, whose furniture defy gravity sitting firmly on the floor that is the ceiling, there is evidence of an occupant who has been up to something. Accompanying the house is a film, titled Always After (The Glass House) (2006).

The Knitting Machine
On June 30, 2005, MASS MoCA presented an American sculptural installation by Dave Cole, who was in residence at MASS MoCA with his project The Knitting Machine which comprised two excavators specially fitted with massive 20′ knitting needles. The knitting project was expected to be completed by July 3. The product, "The Knitting Machine", is an oversized American flag.

When the flag was removed from "The Knitting Machine" it was folded into the traditional flag triangle and was on display in a presentation case which Cole described as "slightly smaller than a Volkswagen Beetle", accompanied by the 20′ knitting needles and a video of the knitting process.

Material World
Sculpture to Environment. Working in a range of industrially produced materials—from plastic sheeting to fishing line—Michael Beutler, Orly Genger, Tobias Putrih, Alyson Shotz, Dan Steinhilber, and collaborators Wade Kavanaugh and Stephen B. Nguyen engage the former factory spaces of the museum's second and third floors, creating extraordinary environments from ordinary things.

Leonard Nimoy
Secret Selves. Artist/actor Leonard Nimoy exhibited a recent photographic series. Shooting in nearby Northampton, Massachusetts, Nimoy recruited volunteers from the community with an open call for portrait models willing to be photographed posed and dressed as their true or imagined "secret selves". Accompanying the large, life-size photographs is a video documenting the artist's conversations with his subjects.

Past Building 5 exhibitions
Past exhibitors in Building 5 include Robert Rauschenberg, Tim Hawkinson, Robert Wilson, Ann Hamilton, Cai Guo-Qiang, Carsten Höller, Sanford Biggers, Xu Bing, and Ledelle Moe.

Christoph Büchel's installation 
In May 2007, the museum became embroiled in a legal dispute with Swiss installation artist Christoph Büchel. The museum had commissioned Büchel to create a massive installation, "Training Ground for Democracy", the exhibit was to include a rebuilt movie theater, nine shipping containers, a full-size Cape Cod–style house, a mobile home, a bus, and a truck. On May 21, 2007, MASS MoCA filed a one-count complaint in the United States District Court for the District of Massachusetts's Judge Michael A. Ponsor, stating that the museum was entitled to present to the public Büchel's art installation without the artist's consent.

Büchel claimed that allowing the public to view it in an unfinished state and without his permission would misrepresent his work, infringe his copyrights, and infringe his moral rights granted under U.S. law, specifically, the 1990 Visual Artists Rights Act. Contrary to Büchel's allegation, the museum alleged that Büchel did not respond to requests by the museum to come and remove the materials. On September 21, 2007, Judge Ponsor of the Federal District Court for Massachusetts in Springfield ruled that there was no copyright violations and no distortion inherent in showing an unfinished work as long as it was clearly labeled as such. Judge Ponsor noted that his opinion would likely not be viewed as creating a legal precedent. Although the museum was granted permission to exhibit Büchel's art installation without his consent, it chose not to do so.

Büchel appealed the district court's ruling, and in January 2010 the United States Court of Appeals for the First Circuit overruled Judge Ponsor, finding that the Visual Artists Rights Act applies to unfinished works of art, and that Büchel asserted a viable claim under the Copyright Act that MASS MoCA violated his exclusive right to display his work publicly.

Directors
 1999–2021: Joe Thompson 
 2021–present: Kristy Edmunds

See also
 National Register of Historic Places listings in Berkshire County, Massachusetts

References

General bibliography 
 Trainer, Jennifer (ed.); Whitman, Nicholas (photographer), MASS MoCA: From Mill to Museum. North Adams: MASS MoCA Publications, 2000.

External links

 
 Photographs: Before, During & After Restoration

1999 establishments in Massachusetts
Adaptive reuse of industrial structures in the United States
Art museums established in 1999
Art museums and galleries in Massachusetts
Buildings and structures in North Adams, Massachusetts
Contemporary art galleries in the United States
Industrial buildings and structures on the National Register of Historic Places in Massachusetts
Modernist architecture in Massachusetts
Museums in Berkshire County, Massachusetts
National Register of Historic Places in Berkshire County, Massachusetts